Ad Dakhiliyah may refer to:
 Ad Dakhiliyah Governorate, Oman
 Dakhiliyah, Syria